Methidiumpropyl-EDTA (MPE) is composed of the DNA intercalator methidium covalently attached to the metal chelator ethylenediaminetetraacetic acid (EDTA) by a short linker.  MPE nonspecifically binds and cleaves DNA at multiple locations.

See also
 Ethidium bromide

References

DNA intercalaters
Tricarboxylic acids